One Eleven Records was an Orlando-based record label concentrating on young rock bands. Established in 2002, by Brad Fischetti, formerly of the boy band Lyte Funky Ones. The label is a part of the EastWest Records family of labels. They have a distribution deal with Warner Bros. Records.

Current bands 
Canon
The Drama Club
Kiernan McMullan
Devin Lima & The Cadbury Diesel
I Am The Dream
Inkwell (band)
North Col
stepsonday
The Windupdeads

Alumni 
Dearestazazel (Inactive)
The Exit Radio (Inactive; formerly "Mashlin")
Foreverinmotion
Jinxed (Inactive)
Kyle McMahon
Mariday (No Longer Affiliated)
The Reign of Kindo (currently with Candyrat Records)
Rookie of the Year (No Longer Affiliated)
Rory (Inactive)
The Spill Canvas (Signed To Sire Records)
Thin Dark Line (Change name to North Col)
This Day And Age (Inactive, some members in The Reign of Kindo)

See also 
 List of record labels

References

External links
 Official Site

American record labels
Record labels established in 2002
Indie rock record labels
Rock record labels
2002 establishments in Florida